The presidency of John Kufuor began on 7 January 2001 and ended on 7 January 2009 after he was inaugurated as the 9th President of Ghana and 2nd of the Fourth Republic. Kufuor was a New Patriotic Party (NPP) candidate. He won the 2000 Ghanaian general election after defeating National Democratic Congress (NDC) candidate John Atta Mills by earning 56.9% of the votes. This marked Ghana's first transition of power through a free and fair election since independence. Kufuor ran for re-election in 2004, winning again against John Atta Mills, and served two full terms.

Kufuor signed various intellectual property laws such as the Trademarks Act, Copyright Act, Patent Act, and Industrial Designs Act to protect Intellectual Property laws in Ghana. Along with parliament, he set up a commission in 2004 to investigate human rights abuses committed by previous Ghanaian military juntas and unconstitutional governments.

First election 

The election began on 7 December 2000 with a second round of the presidential election on 28 December. The presidential elections resulted in a victory for John Kufuor of the New Patriotic Party (NPP), whilst the NPP also won the most seats in the parliamentary elections.

Kufuor had previously run unsuccessfully in the 1996 election, after winning the nomination of the New Patriotic Party (gaining 1034 votes out of the 2000 party delegates).

On 23 October 1998 Kufuor was once again re-nominated by the New Patriotic Party to run for president, while also officially becoming the leader of the party.

Kufuor won the presidential election of December 2000. In the first round of voting, held on 7 December 2000, Kufuor came in first place with 48.4%, while John Atta-Mills, the NDC candidate, came in second with 44.8%. This led to a run-off vote between the two. In the second round, held on 28 December, Kufuor won 56.9% of the vote and emerged victorious. Kufuor was sworn in on 7 January 2001. This was the first democratic changeover of government in the history of Ghana.

Personnel

Ministers of state (2001–2005)
There was a cabinet reshuffle on April 1, 2003.

Ministers of state (2005–2009)
There was a cabinet reshuffle on 28 April 2006.
There was a second cabinet reshuffle to release ministers with presidential ambitions in July 2007.

Policy

Health

Kufuor's National Health Insurance Scheme replaced the existent cash-and-carry system. About 11 million Ghanaians were registered under the new scheme. As president, Kufuor was credited for setting up Ghana's National Ambulance Service. 

About 205 hospitals and clinics were constructed and renovated during Kufuor's presidency. This included the addition of the Accident and Emergency Centre at the Komfo Anokye Teaching Hospital, which became the largest in Ghana upon completion. Kufuor also introduced free maternal health care in public hospitals.

Education
Kufuor initiated Ghana's national school feeding programme.
He institutionalised the capitation grant for school children at the basic level as each student was entitled to $2 for cultural sports and development. During the Kufuor administration, an additional year was added to the Senior Secondary School curriculum, changing it from three years to four years. It was also renamed Senior High School. He started the model school senior high school initiative to upgrade some deprived schools to the level of some first-class senior high schools.

Infrastructure 
There was a complete renovation of the Accra Sports Stadium and the Baba Yara Stadium as well as the newly built Essipong and Tamale stadium in 2008, in order to enhance Ghana's hosting of the CAN 2008. On 27 February 2004, the president commissioned the Tetteh Quarshie Interchange for traffic.

President Kufuor obtained a record $500 million grant from the US's Millennium Challenge Account for economic development. The fund was anchored on unleashing the entrepreneurial, creative and innovative potential of Ghanaians as a means of creating wealth as well as removing all barriers in the form of social challenges Ghanaians faced. This socio-economic vision included the Five Priority Areas Programme: the pursuit of good governance, modernisation of agriculture for rural development, private sector participation, enhanced social services, and vigorous infrastructural development. The fund also served as the source of finance for the construction of the George Walker Bush Highway.

Re-election 

Four candidates contested the 2004 Ghanaian general election.

Kufuor was re-elected in presidential and parliamentary elections held on 7 December 2004, earning 52.45% of the popular vote in the first round. This avoided a run-off and resulted in the New Patriotic Party securing more seats in the Parliament of Ghana.

Coinciding parliamentary elections 

Kufuor's New Patriotic Party won 128 seats in parliament, for a governing majority of 26.

See also 
Aliu Mahama

References 

Presidencies of Ghana
 
Political history of Ghana
Governments of Ghana
2001 establishments in Ghana
2009 disestablishments in Africa
2009 in Ghana